Bertrade de Montfort (c. 1070 – 14 February 1117) was Queen of France by her marriage to Philip I of France. Initially married to Fulk IV, Count of Anjou, she left him and married Philip. Later she founded a daughter house of Fontevraud Abbey at Haute-Bruyeres.

Life
She was the daughter of Simon I de Montfort and Agnes of Evreux. Her brother was Amaury de Montfort.

In 1089, Bertrade and Fulk, Count of Anjou were married, and they became the parents of a son, Fulk. In 1092 she left her husband to live with King Philip I of France. Philip married her on 15 May 1092, despite the fact that they both had spouses living. He was so enamoured of Bertrade that he refused to leave her even when threatened with excommunication. Pope Urban II did excommunicate him in 1095, and Philip was prevented from taking part in the First Crusade.

According to Orderic Vitalis, Bertrade was anxious that one of her sons succeed Philip, and sent a letter to King Henry I of England asking him to arrest her stepson Louis. Orderic also claims she sought to kill Louis, first through the arts of sorcery and then by poison. Whatever the truth of these allegations, Louis succeeded Philip in 1108. Bertrade took the veil at Fontevraud Abbey following Philip's death, but moved to a daughter house, which she founded, at Hautes-Bruyeres by 1112. She died in 1117.

Marriages and issue
Bertrade and Fulk IV, Count of Anjou, had:
Fulk of Jerusalem, Count of Anjou and King of Jerusalem (1089/1092–1143)

Bertrade and Philip I of France had:
Philip of France, Count of Mantes (living in 1123)
Fleury of France, Seigneur of Nangis (living in 1118)
Cecile of France (died 1145), married (1) Tancred, Prince of Galilee; married (2) Pons of Tripoli

References

Sources

1070s births
1117 deaths
Year of birth uncertain
House of Montfort
People excommunicated by the Catholic Church
Order of Fontevraud
Countesses of Anjou
French queens consort
11th-century French people
11th-century French women
12th-century French people
12th-century French women